Tecumseh High School is a public high school for students in grades 9-12 located in the city of Tecumseh, Michigan. Tecumseh schools are essentially rural and seen as a middle class school system. For the 2001 school year, the Tecumseh Public School system opened the doors to a new $33 million high school. The University of Michigan, University of Toledo, Eastern Michigan University, Adrian College, Siena Heights University, Washtenaw Community College, Monroe Community College and Cleary College are all within a  radius of the community. Jackson College a strong partner with the Tecumseh School District, offers classes both in Tecumseh and neighboring Adrian".

History

The history of educational facilities in Tecumseh, Michigan began in the winter of 1824 when the founders of the city of Tecumseh, the Evans Family and Brown Family, constructed a schoolhouse made of tamarack poles to house their children. In 1826, a larger, eighteen feet by twenty feet, privately funded school house was built on the public square on Maumee Street. Until 1832 this was the only village school in Lenawee County; in that year, another private school was established on the ridge beyond Evans Creek until being moved to the county courthouse in 1836. The Tecumseh school system continued in this fashion for three years until a branch of the State University was opened. 1840 brought the first publicly funded educational facility when the state of Michigan promoted the building of brick buildings for the house schools. In 1855 a site was purchased at the corner of Ottawa and Shawnee Streets, and in the next year, the school was finished.  The year 1866 saw the first graduating class of Tecumseh with a total of eight students receiving diplomas.
Typical of most schools of the era, Tecumseh High School operated more as a college rather than a high school of today. In 1905, students were subject to examination and classification for admission which limited the class size significantly. Students deemed eligible for admission were then subject to tuition: $16.67 to the high school, $13.33 to the grammar department, $11.67 to the primary department. These three departments housed the three courses of study: Latin, Science, and English. A student with a diploma in one of these areas was given admission to any college in the state, without examination. It wasn't until 1919 that the school took the form of a traditional high school.
Construction for an updated building on nearby Maumee Street began on December 3, 1948.  By 1950, the classroom section of the new high school was complete.

Notable alumni
 Andrew Kehoe - Bath Consolidated School bomber and mass murderer 
 Julie Parrish - TV and occasional film actress
 Elman Service - Cultural anthropologist
 Tim Ries – Jazz saxophonist, composer, and music educator
 Josh Frost - lead singer of the band Search the City

References

External links
 Tecumseh High School
 Tecumseh Softball

Public high schools in Michigan
Educational institutions established in 1867
Schools in Lenawee County, Michigan
Tecumseh, Michigan
1867 establishments in Michigan